Pecks Beach or Peck's Beach is a barrier island located on the Jersey Shore in Cape May County, New Jersey.

Geography
Pecks Beach is a barrier island along the Atlantic Ocean between Great Egg Harbor Inlet on the northeast, and Corson Inlet on the southwest.

It was described in 1834 as,

An 1878 description follows, viz.,

Ocean City occupies the entirety of Pecks Beach, along with some adjacent uninhabited islands.

References

Landforms of Cape May County, New Jersey
Barrier islands of New Jersey
Islands of New Jersey